Madhureeta Anand is an Indian independent film director, writer and producer. She has directed two feature films, written five feature films, directed many documentary films and series, spanning an array of genres. Many of her films have won national and international awards. 
She writes for various websites and magazines and has been featured in various books and other publications. 
She is also an activist for women's rights and rights of other minorities. She has consistently used her films and influence to support the causes of ending violence against women and children.

Profile
Madhureeeta Anand's third feature film, tentatively titled "A Taj Mahal Love Story" was announced during President Trudeau's visit to India as the first official Indo-Canadian co-production and is slated to go on the floors in September 2018.

Her fourth feature film titled "Sultana Daku", which is the story of a dacoit who lived in India in the 1920s is expected to start principal photography in December 2018.

Madhureeta Anand's second feature film is titled Kajarya, had a successful theatrical release in India on 4 December 2015.  The film opened to rave reviews across the nation. Kajarya premiered at The Dubai International Film Festival. The film's Swiss Premier took place in Geneva at The International Human Rights Film Festival where Kajarya was one of the 8 films in competition. The film was also selected to The Montreal World Film Festival and Eless Tournet Brussels where it was the opening film of the festival. Kajarya was also chosen as one of the top five films to see in 2014 by Forbes India Magazine. Kajarya won the best foreign film award at The Silk Route Film Festival in China. The film has an all‐new star cast of trained actors and explores the issue of female feoticide and related women's issues.

Madhureeta Anand launched her own YouTube channel – Ma Films (an acronym for Madhureeta Anand Films) to launch content that talks about social causes.  The films will accompanied by a wide campaign. The first campaign to be launched by Ma Films is "Know Your Porn", an animated web series that is aimed at providing information and provoking discussion around porn watching in India. The series will be launched in May 2018.

Madhureeta founded and is the festival director of the only Digital Film Festival in the country; the 0110 Digital Film Festival. The festival, started as collaboration with the British Council, Fame Cinemas and PVR Pictures, has well known filmmakers and actors on its jury.

She has written, directed and executive produced with PVR Pictures, her first full‐length commercial feature film Mere Khwabon Mein Jo Aaye, starring Randeep Hooda, Arbaaz Khan and Raima Sen, which released on 6 February 2009.

In 2007, she directed, produced and wrote Laying Janaki to Rest, a documentary film on Sita the Goddess; The Magic Tent, which she co‐wrote and produced. In 2006, she was awarded the Silver Conch at the Mumbai International Film Festival, for her film Walking on a Moonbeam.

Her documentary Education – A reality or a myth was nominated at the Zanzibar International Film Festival in 2002. Her film titled Sin was nominated in the Short Film section at The Damah Film Festival at Seattle (USA) in October 2002.

Furthermore, she was the only woman camera director on a crew of directors on Channel 4 (UK)'s award-winning series The Greatest Show on Earth – The Kumbh Mela (2001). She has also won the Royal Television Society Craft Award for it.

In 2001, Madhureeta produced and directed a thirty‐minute documentary feature on the Kumbh Mela‐ 'In Search of Salvation' for the German Telecast Footprint. (Austria/Switzerland/Germany). The Damah Film Festival at Seattle (USA) invited this film on 11 October 2001, where it fetched her an award for Excellence in Film Making. It was also nominated at the Commonwealth Film Festival (Manchester, U.K. 30 June 2002).

Career

Kajarya
Kajarya is a feature film that has been making waves internationally and deals with the pertinent topic of sex selection in India.  It is a thriller that pans across the city and village tells the story of two women one an opportunistic journalist from New Delhi and the other a woman from the villager who is entrusted with the job of killing new born girls.

The film released in India on 4 December 2015 to rave reviews and a good audience reception.

Here's what Eve Ensler (writer of The Vagina Monologues) said after seeing the film:

"Kajarya is a fierce, disturbing, lyrical and illuminating tour de force imploring us to face the patriarchal murdering of  thousands of our girl babies and how structural and traditional oppression, destroys women, turning them against their own souls. It is a brave and important film and should be seen by all."

The Hollywood Reporter review said:

"Kajarya is both disturbing and engrossing as it plunges the viewer into the heart of darkness in an Indian village…Director Madhureeta Anand is a storyteller who interweaves the lives of two women -- one modern, the other ancient ..."

Kajarya was chosen as one of the top five films to see in 2014 by Forbes India Magazine and was described as:

"An assured second feature, and a strong, original voice about female foeticide in India, the film questions notions of women's emancipation, and explores how India lives in many centuries at the same time."

The film premiered at The Dubai International Film Festival as one of the 3 films that had its world premier there. The Film's Europe Premier took place in Geneva at The International Film Festival and Forum on Human Rights where Kajarya was one of the 8 films in competition. The film was the opening film at Elles Tournet in Brussels, a prestigious women's film festival. In addition, the film was selected at The Montreal World Film Festival. Kajarya also won the "Best Foreign Film Award" at The Silk Road Film Festival in Xian, China. The festival had 140 films and Kajarya was the only Indian film to win an award. The film has since traveled to 10 other film festivals in America and Europe. Kajarya was screened in Los Angeles at both The Lady Film Festival and The LA Femme Film Festival.

The film is co-produced by Bengali director Qaushiq Mukherjee popularly known as Q,  Starfire movies and Madhureeta Anand's company Ekaa Films. The film's music has been scored by Richard Horowitz, who is a Golden Globe winner and an Academy Award nominee and has worked with directors like Bernardo Bertolucci, Luc Besson and Oliver Stone.

Several film critics have also seen it and lauded it for its excellent filmmaking. At a private screening in Los Angeles, several members of the American film industry also appreciated the film.

The film trailer launched in New Delhi, Jantar Mantar and Madhureeta choose this place because Jantar Mantar is consider where all social movements have been launched.

Madhureeta Anand had started her career making documentaries.  Later she went on and worked for various television shows where she soon realized that Television was not for her. She then formed her own company and started producing and directing documentaries, short films and then feature films.

Documentaries and Short films   
Most of her work has explored the areas of culture, religion and anthropology. Some of her films have looked at issues of education and child abuse in India. Her films have been telecast on international channels such as BBC, Channel 4, Discovery and National Geographic. These films also won her several national and international awards.

The 0110 International Digital Film Festival
She is also the founder and festival director of the first Digital Film Festival in India – The 0110 International Digital Film Festival. The festival, started as collaboration with the British Council, Fame Cinemas and PVR Pictures, has well known filmmakers and actors on its jury.

Mere Khwabon Mein Jo Aaye
In 2007 she embarked on her first commercial feature film  "Mere Khwabon Mein Jo Aaye" (The one she dreamt of). The film written, directed and executive produced  by Madhureeta Anand in collaboration with PVR Pictures, and starred Raima Sen, Arbaaz Khan and Randeep Hooda. The film released on 6 February 2009.

Recurring themes
Most of Madhureeta's films tend to have strong female characters in the narrative. Her strong sense of gender politics comes through in her stories. All the films directed by her have been written by her and tend to use an active, engaging narrative to go much deeper. Her films, typically take the audience into a world that women inhabit making storytelling both unique and incisive.

Future projects
She is currently working on a feature-length documentary on the "Naga Sadhvis" for the European theatrical network with Austria based production company Navigator Films.

Her next feature film is titled Kotha No 22 (Brothel No 22), and is a thriller set in a brothel.  Madhureeta will begin shooting the film in November 2014.

Early life and education
Madhureeta Anand was born in New Delhi. Her father was an army officer and her mother a Kathak dancer who worked in television as a producer.  Her father Col. V.K Pachauri was posted to various cities like Delhi, Pune and Udhampur. After her father died she moved with her mother Sarita and elder sister Mandakini to New Delhi and studied at The Modern School, Barakhamba Road for four years.  She was 11 years old when her mother remarried Maj. V.K. Anand.  She then took her step father's surname and went from being Madhureeta Pachauri to Madhureeta Anand. At age 11 she went to boarding school at The Lawrence School, Sanawar.  She says, "It was a fortunate event that I ended up in a school that I loved and found friends that have become family. The school really shaped who I am".  After school she studied sociology at Delhi University but hardly spent any time in the classroom.  Most of her years in college were spent volunteering at The Spastics Society and in the villages of Orissa where she spent time with activists working to protect the rights of the villagers. During this time she also learnt German, photography and did a course in International Relations.  After her graduation she went to film school at the Jamia Milia Islamia University where she learnt the ropes of film making.

Awards and recognition
 She was a Jury member of the Indian Panorama of the 47 International Film Festival of India, 2016.
 She is one of the fifteen women leaders from India listed in a book and exhibition titled "The Poetry Of Purpose" that will travel to several cities in India and the United States.
 She won the Karamveer award for her work on social issues through films in March 2015
 Her film Walking on a Moonbeam won the Silver Conch at the Mumbai International Film Festival in 2006 
 Her documentary Education – A reality or a myth was nominated at the Zanzibar International Film Festival in 2002.
 Her film titled Sin was nominated in the Short Film section at The Damah Film Festival at Seattle (USA) in 2002.
 She was the only woman camera director on a crew of directors on Channel 4 (UK)'s award-winning series, The Greatest Show on Earth – The Kumbh Mela (2001). She won the Royal Television Society Craft Award for it.
 Her documentary feature on the Kumbh Mela- In Search of Salvation for the German Telecast Footprint (Austria/Switzerland/Germany) fetched her award for Excellence in Film Making at the Damah Film Festival at Seattle, USA in 2001. It was nominated at the Commonwealth Film Festival (Manchester, U.K.) in 2002.

Writings
Madhureeta Anand has written 9 screenplays both in English and Hindi languages – Kajarya, Mere Khwabon Mein Jo Aaye (Hindi), O Mere Piya (Hindi), Decorate The Earth, Krishna Circus, Maharani, Kotha No 22 (Hindi), Sultana Daku and No Authority. She has been featured in “Poetry Of Purpose” a book that featured women achievers who made a social impact with their work.

Madhureeta had a column for India Today's online news portal Daily O where she regularly contributed for two years.

She was also a part of  “Search of Sita”  (edited by Namita Gokhale and Malashri Lall), an anthology of essays about the Goddess Sita. Her interview about her experience of making a film on Sita was featured as a part of this book.

Madhureeta Anand is one of the authors of a compilation of essays about Radha, the consort of the Indian deity Krishna, in the book “Finding Radha” (edited by Namita Gokhale and Malashri Lall).

Activism
Madhureeta Anand has consistently used her influence and films to advocate causes related to gender, sexuality and child rights. Her film Kajarya collaborated with 21 NGOs in India and abroad including Eve Ensler's - One Billion Rising. The film has become a tool for activism and to provoke discussion. The film is being screened across India's villages and small towns by the partner NGOs. The film is slated to be screened in the Parliament. Kajarya is now being quoted as an example of the coming together of social causes and entertainment. She frequently writes columns and articles voicing her views on these subjects. She has formed  "The Two Way Street Trust" to bridge the gap between social issues and entertainment.

Madhureeta has launched her Digital Channel, ma films (Madhureeta Anand Films), along with Culture Machine to create a space for the confluence of films and social issues. The channel is a destination for films that either have a social message or can be tools for social activism. Each of these films will be surrounded by a campaign to help to bring to light the issues being addressed by the films.  The Channel launched on 27 July 2016.
 
She is also launching an app called "Phree" for the safety of women. The app is due to be launched in August 2016.
 
Madhureeta has a column "The Big M" on India Today's website DailyO.
 
She has launched with ActionAid India -  "Two Way Street" an initiative to catalyse media for social change. Two Way Street's key goals are to facilitate accurate representation of communities, social causes and issues through the media. And act as an advisory body to provide non-binding recommendations to stakeholders engaged with media.
She has set up a project in East Delhi's Mandaveli area with SMS  - an NGO working in the area of gender. The project is aimed at working with the men of the area to make it a safer place. The activities range from using drama and music to help men express themselves and holding workshops with the men of Mandaveli to discuss issues of masculinity and how this has influenced their worldview.  The project has participation from MenEngage, Azad Foundation and CJHS – all of whom have a track record in working with men on issues of gender.

Madhureeta has won the Karamveer award for her work that combines filmmaking with activism.

References

External links 
 

1973 births
Living people
Indian women film directors
Indian women screenwriters
Modern School (New Delhi) alumni